General elections were held in Singapore on 6 May 2006. President S.R. Nathan dissolved parliament on 20 April 2006 on the advice of Prime Minister Lee Hsien Loong three weeks before the election. The People's Action Party (PAP) won 66.6% of the overall votes and gained 82 out of 84 seats. The PAP held the office of Prime Minister for a twelfth consecutive term. The general election was held under the first-past-the-post system. On Nomination Day, the PAP gained 37 seats in divisions which were uncontested by other parties. The main election issues included employment, cost of living, housing, transport, education, the need for an effective opposition voice in parliament, and the quality of the candidates.

This election marked the first time since 1988 that total eligible voter population in contested seats as well as voter turnout exceeded 1 million and this figure has not dropped ever since. Together with 2011 GE, PAP also decided not to return the mandate on Nomination Day but on the Election Day.

Background
The 2006 General Election was the 15th General Election in Singapore and the 10th since independence in 1965. The governing People's Action Party (PAP) sought to secure their twelfth consecutive term in office since 1959. This would be the first election since Lee Hsien Loong replaced Goh Chok Tong and became PAP's Secretary-General in 2004.

Political parties

Besides the ruling PAP, the other major political parties were the Workers' Party of Singapore (WP) led by Low Thia Khiang, the Singapore People's Party (SPP) led by Chiam See Tong, the National Solidarity Party (NSP) led by Steve Chia, and the Singapore Democratic Party (SDP) led by Chee Soon Juan, who himself was ineligible to run in this election because of a 2002 conviction.

Four parties, including the SPP and the NSP, contested the election as members of the Singapore Democratic Alliance (SDA).

Election deposit
For this election, the deposit for each candidate was set at S$13,500 (approximately US$8,590 or £4,620) which was about 8% of the total annual salary to a member of parliament in the preceding year, rounded to the nearest S$500. The regulations of the elections stated that the deposit was to be forfeited if the candidate failed to obtain at least one-eighth of the votes.

Electorate
All citizens at least 21 years of age, based on the Registers of Electors, were eligible to vote. The Elections Department had completed its revision of the Registers and made them available for public inspection from 17 January through 30 January 2006. There were 2,158,439 eligible voters. The 2006 election was the first election where more than half the electorate were of the post-independence generation, i.e., those born after Singapore's independence in 1965.

For the first time in Singapore's election history, Singaporeans living overseas were able to vote at designated polling stations located within Singapore's High Commissions, Embassies or Consulates in other countries. To be qualified to vote overseas, they must have had either resided in Singapore for an aggregate of two of the past five years, or be overseas for reasons of employment or education related to the Singapore government. There were several overseas polling stations, namely Tokyo, Canberra, Beijing, Shanghai, Hong Kong, London, Washington, D.C. and San Francisco. 1,017 Singaporeans had registered for overseas voting by 22 March 2006, although only 558 voted, as the rest had a walkover in their constituencies.

Electoral divisions

On 3 March 2006, the Electoral Boundaries Review Committee published the updated list of electoral divisions. There were fourteen Group Representation Constituencies (GRC), each with five or six seats, and nine Single Member Constituencies (SMC). The total number of seats remained the same at 84 as the previous general election in 2001, but there are some minor changes and tweaks. The two opposition held SMCs, Hougang SMC and Potong Pasir SMC were intact. Also unchanged was the Chua Chu Kang SMC which saw a close contest in the previous election between the ruling PAP's Low Seow Chay and NSP's Steve Chia. The boundaries for the five Group Representation Constituencies (namely Bishan–Toa Payoh, Hong Kah, Jalan Besar, Jurong and Tampines) were also intact.

The changes made in the constituencies were:

Election issues
As in previous elections, bread and butter issues including jobs, medical care and cost of living dominated the election campaign. Other major election issues are listed in the following.

 Social
 Integrated Resorts and legalisation of casino gambling
 Education policy
 Public transport
 Public housing policy
 Lift Upgrading Programme(LUP)
 Governance
 Progress package and Budget 2006
 Group representation constituency system
 Central Provident Fund scheme
 Internal Security Act and civil liberties
 Ministerial pay
 Others
 National Kidney Foundation Singapore scandal
 Integrity of the candidates, such as the James Gomez incident

Timeline

Pre-nomination day events

Dissolution of Parliament
On 20 April 2006, Parliament was dissolved by President Sellapan Ramanathan on the advice of Prime Minister Lee Hsien Loong. Later that day, the President issued the writ of election and the government announced that the election would be held on Saturday, 6 May 2006, with nomination day on Thursday, 27 April 2006. The Returning Officer was to be Tan Boon Huat, Chief Executive Director of the People's Association.

New/outgoing candidates
This election saw a large number of new candidates as the major political parties had undergone self-renewal in recent years. Many of the new candidates belong to the post-1965 generation. A total 49 candidates made their debut among which include notable PAP candidates include Grace Fu, Lui Tuck Yew, Josephine Teo and Masagos Zulkifli, while WP introduced their party's chairwoman Sylvia Lim (who would later become the first-ever female opposition MP-elect in the next election), as well as James Gomez (now SDP member) and Goh Meng Seng (who later founded the People's Power Party).

A total 24 candidates did not seek re-election, among which were former cabinet ministers Lee Yock Suan and former Speaker of Parliament Tan Soo Khoon, as well as Tan Cheng Bock and Deputy Prime Minister of Singapore Tony Tan, though they would later return to compete in the 2011 presidential election five years later in which the latter won; the former would later return to the political fray in the 2020 elections as a founder of Progress Singapore Party.

Budget day and progress package
On 17 February 2006, Prime Minister Lee Hsien Loong, who was also Minister for Finance and Secretary General of the PAP, delivered the country's Budget Statement to the Parliament. He released details of a S$2.6 billion "progress package" including S$500 million for Central Provident Fund top-ups, S$400 million for workfare bonuses, and S$200 million bonuses for national servicemen. Largely due to this package, the 2006 Budget incurred a deficit of S$2.86 billion.

Low Thia Khiang (WP) came out strongly against the progress package which he said was no more than a vote-winning tool for the PAP. Low called for greater transparency on how the government intend to finance the package and to compensate for the budget shortfall. Deputy Prime Minister Wong Kan Seng (PAP) later dismissed claims that the progress package constitutes a form of vote buying.

Workers' Party manifesto
The Workers' Party (WP) was the first party to launch an update to its manifesto on 14 January 2006. Among its policy proposals, WP called for the Presidency to revert to its former ceremonial role and the abolishment of the GRCs, the Ethnic Integration Policy for Housing and Development Board flats, the Resident Committees and the Citizen Consultative Committees. It also revealed its intentions to establish a central agency in the provision of public transport, set up of a national unemployment insurance scheme and a more comprehensive national health insurance scheme among a host of other things.

On 21 January, PAP made various criticisms on the WP's proposals, describing four of their proposals as "four time bombs...[which] will weaken and tear Singapore apart". Khaw Boon Wan, revealed various changes in medical policies, including the Medisave scheme, which had been a constant target for criticism by opposition parties. He also chided the WP for its "failure to understand what makes inter-racialism work in Singapore and why we are different from the rest of the world", referring the four points brought up by Ng Eng Hen as "poisons" Workers' Party chairman Sylvia Lim released a press statement on 22 January, responding to each of the four "time bombs" criticised by Ng and adding that the party was standing firmly by its manifesto.

Goh Chok Tong's special assignment
On 19 March, Lee Hsien Loong said that PAP was aiming to win all the constituencies including the two opposition wards in Hougang SMC and Potong Pasir SMC, stating that "We want to win, this is not masak-masak [a Malay term meaning a child's game]". The PAP candidates for these two wards were respectively previously-contested candidates Eric Low and Sitoh Yih Pin respectively, and both candidates had been working the ground in these wards since along with assistance by Goh Chok Tong who had been given the special assignment to help the PAP win the two wards.

Goh had suggested that if Eric Low and Sitoh Yih Pin won the election, they would be given extra latitude when speaking and voting in parliament and not be subjected to the political Whip. Goh also said that he would help Sitoh to gain a post in the new Cabinet if elected. Hougang and Potong Pasir residents were also been promised housing upgrades worth $100 million and $80 million respectively if PAP was to retake the two seats as both of these constituencies have not been selected for housing upgrades or provided with lifts that stop on every floor due to the constituencies being held by the opposition. When the PAP shaved Low's vote share from 58% to 55% in the 2001 General Election, Goh offered to upgrade Hougang estate if the share was reduced to 52%.

Remarks in The New Democrat
In April 2006, the SDP published an article headlined "Govt's role in the NKF scandal" in the SDP party newspaper The New Democrat regarding the National Kidney Foundation Singapore scandal.  On 22 April, letters of demand were served on twelve members of the SDP and the publisher. Drew and Napier, the law firm acting for Lee Hsien Loong and Lee Kuan Yew, said that the newspaper article had alleged that the two Lees were "dishonest and unfit for office", that Lee Kuan Yew "devised a corrupt political system for the benefit of the political elite", and that he managed the Government of Singapore Investment Corporation in a "corrupt manner". In addition, according to the letter of demand, the newspaper also alleged that Lee Hsien Loong had "perpetuated a corrupt political system for the benefit of the political elite" and how he and his Government "had access to the information which has now been unearthed about NKF but corruptly concealed and covered up the facts to avoid criticism". The letters demanded that damages be paid and an apology made in the media by 25 April.

Four of SDP's eleven committee members apologized shortly after, while the party's chairman refused to do so, as it would constitute "an admission of guilt". An apology had been formally rejected by the party, though the party would not oppose individual members making personal apologies. M Ravi, the lawyer representing most of the accused, had rejected claims made in the letters that allegations made in the paper were "highly defamatory", and he "[does] not see how a government or public body could be defamed". On 27 April, Chee said that the threat of legal action was already seriously affecting SDP's campaign at Sembawang GRC: "Lawyers for Mr Lee Kuan Yew and Mr Lee Hsien Loong have gone as far as to sue the printer, so much so that he is so frightened he dares not publish our election material." SDP was still seen selling the publication, and the Lees were seeking aggravated damages. Only the Chee siblings have yet to make a public apology.

SDP podcast
On 25 April, Elections Department warned SDP that it would take action against the party if they did not remove audio files and podcasts from the party's website, as they were against election advertising regulations under the Parliamentary Elections Act. Within hours after the notice was issued, SDP posted a notice on its website that the podcast service was suspended.

Nomination day

Planning for nomination day by political parties
As early as January 2006, when it became clear that the election would be held soon, the political parties began making definitive plans for Nomination Day.

On 10 March 2006, major opposition parties hosted a meeting, after which they announced their intention to contest 57 of the 84 seats in Parliament, but full details of the opposition's plan was not revealed until Nomination Day itself. Steve Chia told reporters, "Any self-respecting politician will hold his cards close to his chest."

There were nine Single Member Constituencies for the election. For smaller political parties and independents who do not have sufficient candidates and resources to contest the GRCs, the SMCs were the only constituencies that they could afford to run; many analysts cited that opposition candidates stand a greater chance of winning in SMCs as compared to GRCs, and all nine SMCs were expecting contests. The opposition tried to avoid three-cornered fights by co-ordinating with each other. Chiam See Tong (SPP) said that "if we enter into one [three-cornered fight], we're only going to kill ourselves. We're not that stupid."

In March 2006, it was thought that there could be a potential three-way contest in MacPherson SMC, where both Mansor Rahman, Chairman of Democratic Progressive Party, and Sin Kek Tong, Chairman of Singapore People's Party, cited interest to run for that seat, but both members eventually chose not to contest. Tan Lead Shake, ex-Democratic Progressive Party (DPP) member, later joined the National Solidarity Party (NSP) (under the banner in Singapore Democratic Alliance), and became a member of SDA's team contesting Tampines GRC.

As of 26 April 2006, the opposition had indicated that they would contest at least half of the seats in the 84 member Parliament; 47 PAP candidates standing for election with 10 new candidates facing the opposition. Candidates standing for election had only an hour to present their nomination papers and must be accompanied by their proposers, seconders and assentors. Observers projected that the other 37 candidates from seven Group Representative Constituencies would return unopposed and the PAP would be denied a majority on nomination day, an eventuality that proved to be true.

Early announcement of intention by parties 
Some of the opposition parties, such as Workers' Party and Singapore Democratic Alliance, adopted the strategy of announcing early their plans on which constituencies they intended to contest prior to announced changes in electoral boundaries, as a tactical move to earmark those divisions to discourage any third party from contesting in the same divisions leading to three-cornered fights. Another cited reason was that, if the Government electoral commission redrew those boundaries, the opposition would be able to exploit such actions by accusing the PAP of gerrymandering to avoid the ballot challenge.

Nomination day results

On nomination day 47 candidates representing the opposition (a large increase of 29 candidates from the previous election) contested 16 constituencies; all contests were between the PAP and one opposition party, which marked the first (and to-date, the only) election with no three-cornered fights. For the first time since 1980, no independent candidates participated in this election, which was a rare occurrence as independent candidates had participated in every election since 1955.. For the first time since 1988, the total number of uncontested seats (37) from the seven GRCs were less than the majority of the parliament (42 out of 84 seats), and the ruling PAP was not returned to power on nomination day. The Elections Department also announced that over 1.2 million Singaporeans, 56.6% of eligible voters, would be able to cast votes.

Diversity of candidates
Notably, all 18 candidates contested in SMCs were male Chinese. On 28 April, Lee Kuan Yew (PAP) referred to this fact when defending the Group Representation Constituency (GRC) system on the grounds that it ensures minority and women representation in parliament, although there is no prerequisites on GRCs having at least one female candidate.

Over the years, each GRC team has been steadily increased by the government from three to at least five members. WP had called for the abolishment of the GRC system which it considered as a means introduced by the PAP to make it difficult for opposition who lack sufficient resource to contest the large electoral division.

Events between nomination day and election day
 
With the nominations completed, the opposition was contesting 47 seats with the remaining 37 returned to the PAP, resulting in PAP being prevented a walkover majority to form a government on nomination day for the first time since 1988.

Between 28 April to 5 May, a total of 50 political rallies were held by the parties at 24 designated sites during nine days of campaign.  The "Lunchtime Rally Site" at Boat Quay, next to UOB Plaza, made a comeback in the election; it was removed from the list of rally sites in the previous election due to fears of terrorist attacks after the September 11, 2001 attacks.

The Workers' Party had put up their strongest team, consisting of its more prominent candidates led by chairman Sylvia Lim, to contest Aljunied GRC challenging the PAP team led by Foreign Affairs Minister George Yeo. The constituency eventually had the fiercest GRC contest in the election. The strongest GRC team for the SDA was one contesting Jalan Besar GRC. It was led by Sebestian Teo and its members include former MP Cheo Chai Chen.

The hotly contested Single Member Constituencies include Chua Chu Kang SMC where incumbent MP and Minister of State for Education and Manpower Gan Kim Yong was challenged by NSP's secretary-general and then-NCMP Steve Chia. Low Thia Khiang (WP), the incumbent MP for Hougang SMC faced a strong challenge from PAP's Eric Low Siak Meng. Nee Soon East SMC was hotly contested with Senior Minister of State for Law and Home Affairs Ho Peng Kee against Poh Lee Guan (WP). Potong Pasir SMC, another opposition seat held by Chiam See Tong since 1984 was also hotly contested by PAP's Sitoh Yih Pin.

Workers' Party fielded a very young team in Ang Mo Kio GRC, with candidates mostly born after 1965, to compete with the flagship PAP team led by Lee Hsien Loong. On 29 April 2006, Lee referred to his opponents at Ang Mo Kio GRC as "敢死队" (suicide squad) adding that even the bookies would not take bets on the outcome in that constituency contest. In response, Low Thia Kiang said that it was better to be a "敢死队" (suicide squad) and not a "怕死队" (squad that is scared to die). WP's candidate Yaw Shin Leong added that his teammates and himself were mentally prepared to lose but they were not push-overs.

James Gomez saga

Controversy arose during the election surrounding the application for a minority-race candidate certificate by James Gomez of Workers' Party. On 24 April, Gomez went to the Elections Department to fill up the minority-race candidate certificate application form accompanied by the chairperson Sylvia Lim. Instead of handing in the application form to election official, Gomez slipped the form in his bag and went off for an interview. At the time, Sylvia Lim had gone to a waiting area and did not witness the event.

On the eve of Nomination Day, James Gomez went to collect his minority-race candidate certificate claiming he had submitted the application form. After failing to get the certificate, Gomez warned an elections officer of the "consequences". At 1pm that day, an Elections Department staff called Gomez and told him that he did not submit the Indian and minority candidate certificate form. During the call, which was recorded, Gomez changed his story and said that he would get back to them. When the media asked him about the issue, Gomez initially refused to discuss about the issue, but later conceded. Following two days of dispute between both sides, the Elections Department was able to produce video evidence showing that James Gomez did not submit the application form; a day later, James Gomez apologised to the Elections Department at a Worker's Party rally saying he was distracted by his busy schedule.

During the controversy, PAP raised questions about the credibility of Gomez. He was accused of attempting to discredit the Elections Department by claiming they misplaced the form. Two PAP leaders Wong Kan Seng and Lee Kuan Yew called Gomez a "liar" and Lee dared Gomez to sue him and Wong. George Yeo (PAP) also suggested that the Worker's Party should sack Gomez and field a four-member team for the five-member Group Representation Constituency. This was rejected by Low who asserted that PAP was trying to divert public and media attention from main election issues.

Party political broadcast
On both 29 April 2006 and 4 May 2006, the four contesting parties made their political broadcasts over television and radio in the four official languages – the English, Mandarin, Malay and Tamil languages. Each party was given an allocated time based on the number of candidates it fielded. The People's Action Party (PAP) was given 12 minutes with 84 candidates fielded, the Workers' Party (WP) and Singapore Democratic Alliance (SDA) were given 4.5 minutes each with 20 candidates fielded, and the Singapore Democratic Party (SDP) was given 2.5 minutes with 7 candidates fielded. The SDP was represented by Chee Siok Chin, the Workers' Party by Sylvia Lim on the first broadcast and by Tan Hui Hua on the second broadcast, the SDA by Chiam See Tong on both broadcasts, with the PAP by Prime Minister Lee Hsien Loong on the first broadcast and by PAP chairman Lim Boon Heng on the second broadcast.

Debate on housing and lift upgrading
The upgrading of public housing, including the Lift Upgrading Programme (LUP), was a major issue in this election. As in previous elections, PAP had tied the scheduling of housing upgrades to the number of votes the party received in the election. The PAP argued that government was successful in raising the standard of living in the country, and those who supported its various policies, including the upgrading, should be given priority. In the hotly contested Aljunied GRC, George Yeo (PAP) placed lift upgrading the "top of [his] priority list" so that the lift would stop on every floor in as many blocks as possible. Sylvia Lim (WP) accused the PAP of being selective in its upgrading programmes, arguing that this was a divisive policy.

Large turnout at opposition election rallies
The election featured large turnouts at some of the election rallies of the opposition parties, which was unheard of since the 1980s. A report by Malaysian press The Star estimated that around 10,000 people attended the Workers' Party rally on 30 April at Hougang. At the last rally of the Workers' Party at Serangoon Stadium on 5 May, the audience filled up most of the field and even spilled outside the stadium. However, the local media did not report on the large turnout at all, prompting criticism of the credibility of the Singapore media on local political issues.

The PAP dismissed the significance of the crowds, suggesting that crowd size would not necessarily translate into votes.

Results

After polls closed at 8pm, vote counting began. Results were announced by the returning officer Tan Boon Huat. The first result was declared at 10.46pm on 6 May 2006 where PAP candidate Seng Han Thong won the Yio Chu Kang Single Member Constituency with a majority of 8,419. The final result to be declared was for the Sembawang Group Representation Constituency at 12.16am on 7 May 2006 where the six-member PAP team, led by Health Minister Khaw Boon Wan retained the constituency by a wide margin of 53.4%, or 90,633 votes.

The People's Action Party won a 12th consecutive term with its majority virtually untouched, but vote majorities were reduced island-wide. Goh's special assignment in which winning the two opposition-held constituencies were unsuccessful as opposition MPs were re-elected with swings toward their parties, among which Hougang won its largest share of 62.7%, by then it was second lowest votes received after Singapore's independence in any particular ward (which would later be superseded in the next election, where WP received 64.80% of the votes.) The record low for PAP votes in a ward was 30.4% in Potong Pasir SMC during the 1991 elections.

Apart from overseas voting for those who had resided in Singapore for two out of the last five years, this was also the first election where six-member GRCs were contested (among which the Prime Minister's constituency of Ang Mo Kio garnered votes below PAP's national average of 66.6%), and none of the candidates forfeited their election deposits. This was also the second election (after 1980) in history with no independents, likely due to new election laws requiring presence of assentors in Nomination Centres, posing difficulty for candidates without party machinery.

By constituency

Aftermath

Victory parades

To continue with tradition, the winning candidates toured their constituencies to thank voters for their victory in the election. These parades were held in all contested seats as well as walkover Group Representation Constituencies. Victory parades are usually held in the late morning and early afternoon in conjunction with other events organised by the grassroots committee. The candidates were driven on trucks as they broadcast messages of appreciation to the residents. Some losing candidates also toured their constituencies to thank their supporters although their parades were usually smaller than those of the winning candidates.

Non-Constituency Member of Parliament
Elections Department announced that the Workers' Party team for Aljunied GRC received the highest share of votes among losing constituencies with 43.9%, and the party was allowed to appoint a member as Non-Constituency Member of Parliament, replacing Steve Chia. The Central Executive Committee voted for Sylvia Lim with nine in favour and one opposed. Lim would not represent any constituency but she said she was looking forward to the opportunity to fulfil her obligation to supporters and also to voice people's concerns.

Detaining and questioning of Gomez
On 7 May, Gomez was detained by police at Singapore Changi Airport when he was about to take a flight to Sweden for work. The police were investigating an "alleged offences of criminal intimidation and providing false information".  The Elections Department had earlier filed a police report regarding the incident during the election period in which Gomez spoke to an election official in a threatening tone, an episode that was caught on closed-circuit television. Gomez was brought to the Criminal Investigations Department (CID) at Police Cantonment Complex for questioning and to file his statement, after which he was released at midnight. His passport was impounded by the police to prevent him from leaving the country and his air ticket was forfeited as it was non-refundable. He also suffered a loss of income due to his absence from work.

On that night, Sylvia Lim and Low Thia Khiang were also asked to give statements at the CID. On 9 May, Gomez was called again to CID for a questioning session that lasted five hours. Gomez later told the media that he was giving the police "the fullest cooperation."

After three questioning sessions, Gomez was let off with a stern warning by the police who issued a statement stating that the public prosecutor was satisfied that Gomez had committed the offence of using threatening words towards a civil servant but the police decided to release Gomez as he had no prior criminal records. His passport was returned to him and he left for Sweden on 16 May.

Chee Siok Chin's challenge of polling results
On 24 May 2006, SDP member Chee Siok Chin filed a summons on the High Court asking to declare the election results void. In her affidavit, Chee claimed that the PAP had used the HDB upgrading scheme and gave out shares and cash to induce voters to vote for the party and hence secure electoral victory. Chee also wanted the High Court to declare the ban on podcasting during election period as unconstitutional. Chee did not pay the $5000 security costs on time, and the Elections Department did not accept her payment as a result. Senior State Counsel Jefferey Chan said her petition would be deemed to have lapsed the moment she failed to meet the deadline to furnish the security amount for costs and asked the election judge to dismiss the matter. On 22 June, Election Judge Andrew Phang dismissed her application and awarded costs to the Attorney General whom Chee had named as defendant. Her attempt to extend her security deposit payment time was denied by the High Court. As a result, a hearing scheduled on 27 June did not take place. Chee had not followed the rules of the Parliamentary Elections Act which requires them to pay the security deposit within three days after filing the petition.

New cabinet
The new cabinet was inaugurated on 30 May 2006. Prime Minister Lee Hsien Loong reveal lineup in which Raymond Lim relinquished his roles as Second Minister for Finance and Minister in the Prime Minister's Office for a new ministerial portfolio for Transport succeeding Yeo Cheow Tong. Minister for Education Tharman Shanmugaratnam was given another role as Second Minister for Finance, while Minister for Community Development, Youth and Sports Vivian Balakrishnan was given a second post as Second Minister for Information, Communications and the Arts as he relinquished his Second Minister for Trade and Industry.

Five new candidates, Lui Tuck Yew, Lee Yi Shyan, Grace Fu, Teo Ser Luck and Masagos Zulkifli, along with three returning MPs, S Iswaran, Amy Khor and Zainudin Nordin, were promoted as Minister of State or Parliamentary secretaries in political office. 

Senior Minister of State Balaji Sadasivan relinquished his position as Senior Minister of State for Ministry of Health for the Foreign Affairs Ministry, but remained as Senior Minister for State for the MICA. Heng Chee How took Balaji's place as Senior Minister of State for Health; he relinquished his appointments in the Ministry of National Development and Mayor for the Central Community Development Council. Zainul Abidin Rasheed was appointed Senior Minister of State for Foreign Affairs and Koo Tsai Kee as Minister of State for Defence.

Influence of the Internet
The Internet played a much more significant role compared to previous general elections. Singapore has a large number of computer users, with 74% of households owning computers and 2 in 3 households having Internet access. Podcasts, blogs, and online political discussions have become common in Singaporean cyberspace. A blog called "SGRally" was set up to collect recorded rally speeches in this election. Opposition candidates had complained about insufficient rally sites allocated to them in past elections.

In August 2005, Singapore Democratic Party became the first political party in Singapore to launch a podcast called RadioSDP on its party website. Several members of the Workers' Party are active in blogsphere; the notable bloggers are James Gomez, Goh Meng Seng, and Melvin Tan.

On 25 February 2006, the Department of Political Science, National University of Singapore organised a public forum on politics titled "The (In)Significance of Political Elections in Singapore?" Among the speakers were 2nd Assistant Secretary-General of Workers' Party James Gomez, Nominated Member of Parliament (NMP) Geh Min, and former NMP Chandra Mohan. A recording of the forum is available via podcast.

Regulations

Regulation of political content online was an issue throughout the election period. The Media Development Authority (MDA) had reminded Internet content providers to comply with the law of Singapore, including those relating to political content. Online bloggers and podcasts are subject to the Parliamentary Elections Act.

In a notification issued by MDA under the Broadcasting Act, all political websites are required to register with the MDA. These websites include those belonging to political parties as well as to "individuals, groups, organisations and corporations engaged in providing any programme for the propagation, promotion or discussion of political or religious issues relating to Singapore on the World Wide Web through the Internet." A MDA spokesperson said that only a handful of websites have registered and that they mostly belonged to political parties or registered political associations.

Political analyst Cherian George noted that the regulation would hinder the development of citizen journalism in Singapore. A number of bloggers and political commentators had noted that the rules are too broadly defined and were unsure how they would be enforced. They protested that this was a violation of freedom of speech. A candidate Goh Meng Seng (WP) refused to register his blog, saying "I don't see the need to do so as an individual citizen. We have our rights to our political views."

In a parliament session on 3 April 2006, Balaji Sadasivan, the senior minister of state for information, communications and the arts, made some clarification on the regulation in response to a question by Low Thia Khiang. Balaji said that podcasting and streaming of videos were prohibited during the election. On the other hand, pictures of election candidates, political party histories and manifestos were allowed to be used as election advertising on the Internet. He added that bloggers who persistently promoted political views had to register with the MDA. During elections, only political parties, candidates and election agents are allowed to advertise. Balaji warned that those who violate the rules would face prosecution, and said "In a free-for-all internet environment, where there are no rules, political debate could easily degenerate into an unhealthy, unreliable and dangerous discourse, flush with rumours and distortions to mislead and confuse the public." The regulation of political content on the Internet had previously led to the closing down of a popular discussion forum website Sintercom in 2001, after the owner refused to register with the authority and voluntarily shut down his website.
Additionally, publication of election surveys during the election period or exit polls was banned.

Notes

References

External links

 Official elections webpage – Elections Department Singapore
 Singapore-elections – a comprehensive archive of elections results, as well as past ones
 https://web.archive.org/web/20180117131215/http://www.eld.gov.sg/elections_past_parliamentary2006.html - statistics of 2006 Singapore General Election

Official websites of political parties
 National Solidarity Party
 People's Action Party, Manifesto (PDF)
 Singapore Malay National Organisation, (Pertubuhan Kebangsaan Melayu Singapura)
 Singapore Democratic Party, Manifesto
 Singapore People's Party, Manifesto
 Workers' Party of Singapore, Manifesto 2006

News medial special coverage
 Asiaone
 Channel NewsAsia
  Lianhe Zaobao
 Xinhuanet
 Yahoo! Singapore news
 The Singapore Elections Rally Archive – with pictures and videos

Other official information
 Parliamentary Elections Act Singapore Statutes Online, Chapter 218
 Internet Policies and Guidelines – Media Development Authority, for information on regulations regarding political websites
 Singapore Police Force media releases – for list of election rallies.

General elections in Singapore
 
Singapore